Ferenc Molnár (8 April 1891 – ?) was a Hungarian football player and manager. As a player, he played as a midfielder and competed with MTK Budapest for thirteen years before moving to Italy to play for and manage many clubs.

From 1920 onwards, starting with Spes Genova; Molnár acted as a player-manager, eventually in 1926 he became just a manager. For much of the time that Molnár was a manager he moved around each season, spending spells at numerous clubs. In 1943 he was forced to leave Italy when the Hungarian army reserve drafted him.

References

1891 births
People from Érd
Austro-Hungarian people
Hungarian footballers
Association football midfielders
MTK Budapest FC players
Spezia Calcio players
A.C. Ancona players
Hellas Verona F.C. players
Hungarian football managers
Hellas Verona F.C. managers
U.S. Alessandria Calcio 1912 managers
Cagliari Calcio managers
Casale F.B.C. managers
ACF Fiorentina managers
S.S. Lazio managers
Inter Milan managers
S.S.C. Napoli managers
Novara F.C. managers
Udinese Calcio managers
Year of death unknown
A.S.D. La Biellese managers
Hungarian expatriate footballers
Hungarian expatriate football managers
Hungarian expatriate sportspeople in Italy
Expatriate footballers in Italy
Expatriate football managers in Italy
Hungarian expatriate sportspeople in the Netherlands
Expatriate football managers in the Netherlands
Sportspeople from Pest County